The CMLL World Tag Team Championship (CMLL Campeonato Mundial de Parejas in Spanish) is a professional wrestling World Tag Team Championship promoted by Consejo Mundial de Lucha Libre (CMLL; Spanish for "World Wrestling Council") in Mexico and is for two-man tag teams only. The championship was created in 1993 to replace the Mexican National Tag Team Championship and is still promoted by CMLL to this day. It is the top championship promoted by CMLL, with the CMLL Arena Coliseo Tag Team Championship and the Occidente Tag Team Championship considered lower ranked, regional tag team championships. As it is a professional wrestling championship, it is not won or lost competitively but instead by the decision of the bookers of a wrestling promotion. The title is awarded after the chosen team "wins" a match to maintain the illusion that professional wrestling is a competitive sport.

The reigning champions are Los Nuevos Ingobernables ("The New Ungovernables"; Ángel de Oro and Niebla Roja), having defeated Titán and Volador Jr., on January 23, 2022, at CMLL Domingos Arena Mexico. They are the 44th overall champions in their first reign together. Negro Casas and Shocker hold the record for the longest reign as a team, at 1,335 days. Último Guerrero and Rey Bucanero hold the record for the longest combined reigns of any team: 1,185 days divided over three reigns. Individually, Último Guerrero has held the championship six times for a total of 1,923 days, the longest of any individual. The team of Último Guerrero and Dr. Wagner Jr. held the championship for seven days, the shortest reign of any championship team. Casas and Último Guerrero have the most title reigns with six each, while the combinations of Casas and El Hijo del Santo, Último Guerrero and Rey Bucanero and Averno and Mephisto are the only teams to have won the championship three times.

The championship has been declared vacant on a number of occasions, either because of an injury to one of the champions or because a wrestler stopped working for CMLL for a period of time. The championship has been held up once, based on the inconclusive outcome of a match, being vacant for a week until the two teams had a rematch. CMLL has also held a couple of tournaments designed to give the winners of the tournament a match against the champions, declaring them the official number one contender for the champions.

History

Starting in 1957 the Mexican Lucha libre, or professional wrestling, promotion Empresa Mexicana de Lucha Libre ("Mexican Wrestling Enterprise"; EMLL) began promoting the Mexican National Tag Team Championship as the top championship of their tag team division. In 1991 EMLL was rebranded Consejo Mundial de Lucha Libre ("World Wrestling Council"; CMLL) after the promotion left the National Wrestling Alliance in the late 1980s.{{efn|Madigan (2007) p. 32: "in the late 1980s EMLL withdrew from the National Wrestling Alliance" In 1992 then-CMLL executive Antonio Peña left CMLL along with a number of the promotion's wrestlers to form Asistencia Asesoría y Administración (AAA). Among the wrestlers that left CMLL were then-reigning Mexican National Tag Team Champions Misterioso and Volador. The Mexican National Tag Team Championship was not owned by CMLL but rather by the Mexico City Boxing and Wrestling Commission and the commission allowed AAA to take control of the championship. In early 1993 CMLL decided to create their own tag team championship to replace the Mexican National Tag Team Championship and introduced the CMLL World Tag Team Championship. The team of Canek and Dr. Wagner Jr. faced off against Vampiro Canadiense and Pierroth Jr. in the finals of a 16-team tournament to determine the first champions, with Canek and Wagner Jr. winning the match to become the first tag team champions. The duo would hold the title until El Canek left CMLL in November 1994. CMLL held a 32-team tournament from November 11 to December 16, 1994. In the finals "Los Cowboys" (Silver King and El Texano) defeated El Satánico and Emilio Charles Jr. to become the second ever CMLL World Tag Team Champions. Six months later Los Cowboys would lose the title to their longtime rivals los Headhunters.

In September 1996 the champions, the team of Atlantis and Lizmark, were stripped of the championship after an inconclusive match against Los Headhunters. In the subsequent eight-team tournament brothers Silver King and Dr. Wagner Jr. captured the title with a victory over Dos Caras and Último Dragón. The title would be vacated once again only six months later as Silver King left CMLL to work for World Championship Wrestling (WCW). Dr. Wagner Jr. teamed up with Emilio Charles Jr. and the two former champions won an eight-team tournament in August 1997. The title would be vacated once again in 1998 when one half of the tag team champions, Mr. Niebla, was injured. Bestia Salvaje and Emilio Charles Jr. became champions by winning an 8-team tournament and began working a storyline with the team of Negro Casas and El Hijo del Santo, whom they traded the title back and forth with over the next year. In early 1999 El Hijo del Santo left CMLL forcing them to vacate the title once again. Los Guerreros del Infierno ("The Warriors from the Inferno"; Último Guerrero and Rey Bucanero) defeated Mr. Niebla and Villano IV in a tournament final bringing some stability to the title as they have not been vacated since then. Guerrero and Bucanero have held the title three times since then and Guerrero has teamed with Dr. Wagner Jr. and Atlantis to win the championship twice more. CMLL held a number one contender's tournament in both 2008 and in 2013, using the tournament to build the credibility of the tournament winners. Both the 2008 winners, Averno and Mephisto, and the 2013 winners, Rush and La Máscara would go on to win the championship.

In 2000 CMLL revived the CMLL Arena Coliseo Tag Team Championship after it had been dormant since the 1980s. The title became a secondary tag team championship for CMLL, primarily for younger, lower ranked wrestlers. The Guadalajara branch of CMLL has intermittently promoted the Occidente (western) tag team championship, a local championship that is not defended outside the Mexican state of Jalisco.

Reigns

The current champions are Los Nuevos Ingobernables (Ángel de Oro and Niebla Roja). The team won the championship on January 23, 2022,	by defeating Titán and Volador Jr. at CMLL Domingos Arena Mexico. Ángel de Oro and Niebla Roja are the 44th overall champions in their first reign. Negro Casas and Último Guerrero share the record for individual reigns with six, and three teams are tied for most title reigns as a team with Guerrero and Rey Bucanero, Averno and Mephisto and Negro Casas and Hijo del Santo, who all have three reigns. Los Guerreros de la Atlantida (Dragón Rojo Jr. and Último Guerrero) held the title for 640 days, which is the longest reign of any team while Último Guerrero's six reigns combine to 1,923 days. Último Guerrero and Dr. Wagner Jr. held the title for seven days and are thus the team with the shortest reign to date. CMLL has been forced to declare the championship vacant on eight different occasions since its creation in 1993, which meant that there were no champions for a period of time. The title has been declared vacant twice because one of the champions (El Canek and Silver King respectively) left CMLL, and four times due to a major injury to one of the champions. On one occasion CMLL held up the championship, vacating the championship until a rematch between the teams of Místico/Héctor Garza and Averno/Mephisto, a match that Místico and Héctor Garza won to become two-times champions. On February 5, 1999, El Hijo del Santo and Negro Casas defeated Bestia Salvaje and Scorpio Jr. by disqualification, which in CMLL meant that they also won the championship. Casas and Hijo del Santo refused to win the championship in that matter, vacating the championship until the two teams could have a rematch. Casas and Hijo del Santo won the rematch without controversy to win the championship once more.

As the CMLL World Tag Team Championship is a professional wrestling championship, it is not actually won or lost competitively but instead, championship changes are decided by the officials and the bookers of CMLL. The title is awarded after the chosen team "wins" a match to maintain the illusion that professional wrestling is a competitive sport. Championship matches usually take place under best two-out-of-three falls rules. On occasion single fall title matches have taken place, especially when promoting CMLL title matches in Japan, conforming to the traditions of the local promotion. An example of this was when Bushi won the CMLL World Welterweight Championship in a one-fall match on a New Japan Pro-Wrestling show in 2015.

Tournaments

1993
The CMLL World Tag Team Championship was the last of the CMLL branded championships to be created in the years immediately following the name change to Consejo Mundial de Lucha Libre. Until early 1993 the Mexican National Tag Team Championship had served as the main tag team title, but the title moved to AAA when the champions left CMLL to jump to AAA leaving CMLL without a tag team championship. CMLL co-promoted the tournament with the Universal Wrestling Association (UWA), holding the tournament spread out over several CMLL and UWA shows, the tournament started on February 26, 1993, featuring wrestlers from both promotions. The finals were spread out over three shows, with one fall of the match on each of the shows. The finals started place on March 19 on a CMLL show, followed by a second match on March 21 at a UWA show, and the third and final match on March 26 on CMLL's Super Viernes show. The tournament was won by Dr. Wagner Jr. a CMLL regular, and El Canek who had been synonymous with the UWA for over a decade at that point in time.

Tournament bracket

1994
In the summer of 1994 El Canek was planning on leaving CMLL, which meant that CMLL had to make plans for the tag team championship that Canek held at the time alongside Dr. Wagner Jr. The decision was made to hold a 16-team tournament to determine the next champions. The tournament started on July 22, 1994, and ran until August 5. As it turned out El Canek stayed in CMLL longer than expected and was still working for them by the time El Texano and Silver King won the tournament. CMLL named the winning team the "number one contenders", but before they got a chance to wrestle against Canek and Dr. Wagner Jr., Canek left CMLL. Without a championship team to defend against El Texano and Silver King CMLL organized a second 16-team tournament to determine who would wrestle the previous tournament winners for the vacant championship. The second tournament, which ran from November 18 until December 2 featured several wrestlers that also competed in the first tournament, most with different partners. The second tournament was won by El Satánico and Emilio Charles Jr., who ended up losing to El Texano and Silver King on December 16, 1994. With their victory El Texano and Silver King became the second CMLL Tag Team Champions.

Number 1 Contenders tournament

Number 2 Contenders tournament

February 1997

On October 25, 1996 Los Headhunters defeated then reigning CMLL World Tag Team Champions Atlantis and Lizmark to win the titles. After the match was over Los Headhunters continued to attack both of their opponents, which led to the referee disqualifying the team, negating the championship change. Los Headhunters took the championship belts with them, ignoring that they were not actually the champions. The storyline was that the team declared themselves the tag team champions, but CMLL did not have the same opinion, declaring the titles vacant instead. CMLL followed up the decision to vacate the championship by holding an eight-team tournament that spanned their February 21 and February 28, 1997 Super Viernes shows. In the end, the brother team of Dr. Wagner Jr. and Silver King defeated Dos Caras and Último Dragón to become the seventh overall champions.

Tournament bracket

August 1997
The team of Silver King and Dr. Wagner Jr. had held the championship since winning a tournament on February 2, 1997, but in August, 1997 Silver King left CMLL to work for Promo Azteca and the U.S. based World Championship Wrestling (WCW). CMLL held a two-night, eight-team tournament to fill the void left by Silver King leaving. The finals took place on August 29, where Dr. Wagner Jr. and his new partner Emilio Charles Jr. defeated Los Headhunters to become the eight overall champions. 

Tournament brackets

1998
In the fall of 1998 Mr. Niebla suffered an injury while holding the CMLL World Tag Team Championship with Shocker. Due to the injury Mr. Niebla was unable to compete so CMLL declared the championship vacant and put together an eight-team tournament to crown new champions. The tournament started on October 30 and lasted until November 13 where the team of Bestia Salvaje and Scorpio Jr. defeated El Satánico and Dr. Wagner Jr. to become the tenth over all tag team champions.

Tournament brackets

2000
On June 16, 2000, the CMLL World Tag Team Championship was announced as vacant. The official explanation was that co-champion Negro Casas voluntarily gave up the championship to "give other teams a chance", but in reality his partner, El Hijo del Santo, had stopped working for CMLL. CMLL organized a 16-team tournament from June 23 through August 4, 2000, with the finals being at CMLL's Entre Torre Infernal pay-per-view. The finals of the tournament was set to be Los Infernales ("The Infernal Ones"; Rey Bucanero and Último Guerrero) against the team of Emilio Charles Jr. and Mr. Niebla but Emilio Charles Jr. had suffered an injury before the show began. As a result, Los Infernales were declared the new champions. The team was then ordered to defend the championship against Mr. Niebla and his new partner Villano IV so there was still a championship match on the show. Los Infernales retained the championship. They later successfully defended against Mr. Niebla and Emilio Charles Jr. on August 18, 2000.

Tournament brackets

Number one contenders tournament 2008
In January 2008 CMLL put together a 16-team tournament to determine which team would get a title match against then-champions Atlantis and Último Guerrero. The tournament took place over three weeks, with two qualifying blocks and then the final match in the third week. The finals saw former CMLL World Tag Team Champions Los Hijos del Averno ("The Sons of Hell"; Averno and Mephisto) defeating the team of Dos Caras Jr. and La Sombra. On February 1, 2008, Averno and Mephisto defeated Atlantis and Último Guerrero to become the 25th overall champions.

Tournament brackets

Number one contenders tournament 2013

In September, 2013 CMLL arranged a 16-team tournament to determine which duo would be next in line to get a match for the CMLL World Tag Team Championship. In the end, the team of La Máscara and Rush defeated the team of Atlantis and La Sombra. The duo would be awarded the championship on September 18, 2013, when champions Rey Bucanero and Tama Tonga were unable to defend the title due to Bucanero being injured. Months later La Máscara, Rush and La Sombra formed Los Ingobernables during La Máscara and Rush's tag team title reign.

Tournament brackets

2018
On February 7, 2018, CMLL announced that they had stripped then-champions Negro Casas and Shocker of the championship due to a lack of championship defenses. The team had not defended the championship since October 11, 2016, a total of  days without a championship match. CMLL held a 16 team tournament starting on Friday March 2 and is slated to end on March 16 at CMLL's annual Homenaje a Dos Leyendas show.

Footnotes

References

External links
Official CMLL website

Consejo Mundial de Lucha Libre championships
Tag team wrestling championships
World professional wrestling championships